The 1982 National Soccer League season was the fifty-ninth season under the National Soccer League (NSL) name. The season began in May, 1982 and concluded in late October 1982 with the NSL Championship final where Hamilton Steelers successfully defended their title against Toronto Italia in a two-legged series final. Toronto Italia would still achieve a double by producing an undefeated streak to claim the regular-season title and the NSL Cup by defeating St. Catharines Roma. 

The season also marked the final time when the NSL would operate a franchise in the United States.

Overview 
As reports of a potential Canadian national soccer league were becoming more imminent as an alternative to the American based North American Soccer League (NASL) two rival parties the Canadian Major Soccer League (CMSL) and the Canadian Professional Soccer League (CPSL) were attempting to receive sanctioning from the Canadian Soccer Association (CSA) and were competing for national sponsorship. The CMSL attempted to recruit the Ontario-based National Soccer League (NSL) to the discussions to deploy the NSL as the league's eastern affiliate. In December, the CPSL was officially announced and set to debut for the following season with two NSL clubs Hamilton Steelers and Toronto Croatia under the name Mississauga Croatia being granted franchises. The CMSL on the other hand received provisional sanctioning from the CSA in January 1983. After failing to secure any national sponsorship the CMSL failed to make its debut. 

The number of teams within the NSL remained the same as the previous season except for the departure of Toronto Ukrainia. The amount remained as ten teams as a new entry that represented the Latin American community in the Greater Toronto Area known as Dinamo Latino was granted an NSL franchise. Near the conclusion of the season, the league lost its presence in the United States when Detroit Besa withdrew from the competition. A notable friendly tournament sponsored by the Labatt Brewing Company featured European teams such as Celtic F.C.and Dinamo Zagreb against Toronto Italia and Toronto Panhellenic. Toronto Italia managed to upset Celtic with a defeat but ultimately was defeated by Zagreb in the finals. Former league president Joe Piccininni returned to his former post and attempts of a television deal with MTV were announced in hopes of broadcasting league matches.

Teams

Coaching changes

Final standings

Playoffs

Finals

References

External links
RSSSF CNSL page
thecnsl.com - 1982 season

 
1982–83 domestic association football leagues
National Soccer League
1982